The Fourth Government of the Republic of Croatia was the Croatian Government cabinet led by Prime Minister Hrvoje Šarinić. It was announced on 12 August 1992 after the 1992 Croatian parliamentary election. It was the 4th cabinet of Croatia, formed by the ruling Croatian Democratic Union, and was reconstructed on 3 April 1993.

List of ministers and portfolios
The periods in the table fall outside the cabinet's term when the minister listed served in the preceding or the subsequent cabinets.

References

External links
Official website of the Croatian Government

Sarinic, Hrvoje
1992 establishments in Croatia
1993 disestablishments in Croatia
Cabinets established in 1992
Cabinets disestablished in 1993